Hussain Ghuloum Abbas Ali (born 24 September 1969), is a UAE football (soccer) player who played as a left winger for the UAE national football team and Sharjah Club in Sharjah. He played in the 1990 FIFA World Cup

References

External links
 
 

1969 births
Living people
Emirati footballers
1988 AFC Asian Cup players
1990 FIFA World Cup players
1992 AFC Asian Cup players
United Arab Emirates international footballers
UAE Pro League players
Sharjah FC players
Association football midfielders
Footballers at the 1994 Asian Games
Asian Games competitors for the United Arab Emirates